Eduard Meier GmbH (known as "Ed Meier") is a German shoemaking company. Founded in Munich in 1596, it is the oldest existing shoemaking company in the world.

History

The company was founded by Hans Mayr and is first mentioned in 1596. Mayr was selling shoes primarily to the upper class. The company was purveyor to the Saxon royal house, the House of Hohenzollern-Sigmaringen and since 1895 also to the Bavarian royal house, holding a Royal Warrant.

Customers could get customized shoes "for every occasion and usage" by mail order. Mayr made wooden replicas of each customer's feet and stored them for at least 30 years so that customers could choose new shoes from an illustrated catalog.

At the beginning of the 20th century Wilhelm Eduard Meier expanded the offering with ready-made high-quality shoes. After World War II the company was rebuilt from ruins by Eduard Meier II who inherited it from his father. To maximize accuracy of fit Meier used a pedoscope to see feet inside shoes. The result of his examinations were his patent-registered "Peduform" shoes.

Today the company is led by siblings Peter Eduard and Brigitte Meier (13th generation). Besides shoes, their offering includes sports and classic clothing, leather goods and accessories. In the city of Munich they can be delivered by horse-drawn carriage as in former times.

External links

  

Meier
Manufacturing companies based in Munich
Bavarian Royal Warrant holders
Saxon Royal Warrant holders
1596 establishments in the Holy Roman Empire
Companies established in the 16th century
Organizations established in the 1590s